The Producers Guild Film Award for Best Costume Design is an accolade given annually by the Producers Guild Film Awards for best costume design in a film.

References

Producers Guild Film Awards